The 2016–17 season was Ayr United's 107th season of competitive football and their first season back in the second tier of Scottish football, now known as the Championship. Ayr also competed in the League Cup, Scottish Cup and the Challenge Cup.

Summary

Season
In their first season back in the second tier of Scottish football, Ayr United finished in tenth place and were relegated back to League One after only one season in the Scottish Championship. Their relegation was confirmed on the final day of the season with a 2–1 away defeat to Raith Rovers.

Results and fixtures

Pre-season and friendlies

Raydale Cup

Scottish Championship

Scottish League Cup

Group stage
Results

Knockout phase

Scottish Challenge Cup

Scottish Cup

Player statistics

|-
|colspan="10"|Players who left the club during the 2016–17 season
|-

|}

Team statistics

League table

Division summary

League Cup table

Transfers

Players in

Players out

References 

Ayr United F.C. seasons
Ayr